Avid Media Illusion was a digital nonlinear compositing software by Avid Technology targeted at the film and television markets. It ran on Silicon Graphics workstations. The main features were paint, compositing, image manipulation and special effects.

History
Illusion was originally developed by Parallax Software under the name "Advance". Avid later bought Parallax, and renamed "Advance" to "Media Illusion". The software was discontinued on December 6, 2001, officially due to lack of resources to support it any further.   

Media Illusion was targeted at the high-end SGI post production market, which was at the time dominated by Discreet Flame.

In 2001, Softimage, a division of Avid, introduced a new image compositing module in its 3D animation product Softimage XSI 2.0 which is based on Media Illusion 6.0.  The product offers and augments many of the essential image compositing features of Media Illusion on Windows and Linux, but does not offer the video digitizing and playback support, and the OMFI media integration and editing which helped Media Illusion make its place in high end broadcast.  The compositing module integrated in XSI 6.0 (2000 USD) targets RGBA file-based desktop compositing for the 3D artist.

Features
Media Illusion featured distributed rendering using multiple CPUs. Several specialized plug-ins were available from Sapphire, The Foundry, Primatte and Ultimatte, among others.

Development

Release history

See also
Avid Elastic Reality
Avid Matador
Softimage XSI
Avid Technology

IRIX software